Vivienne Garrett is an Australian-based theatre, film and television actress. She is a theatre director, acting and voice coach and also a qualified yoga instructor and therapist. She was born in Sydney, NSW and now lives in Western Australia. Garrett graduated from the National Institute of Dramatic Art (NIDA) in 1970.
 
Her best known role was as rebellious teenager Rose Godolfus in TV serial Number 96, her character was involved in numerous controversial storylines
<ref>Giles, Nigel. Number 96: Australian TV's Most Notorious Address. Melbourne Books</ref>

Early career
As a primary school student she was chosen to star in a theatrical production of The Little Mermaid where she was spotted by Geoff Harvey the then musical director for TCN-9 and subsequently began performing and singing on children's television talent show Comedy Capers. While still a teenager, her first screen acting role was in The Unloved produced by NLT Productions in 1968. After graduating from NIDA she toured with a Theatre in Education company and had guest roles in police dramas Homicide and Matlock Police.

Garrett is best known for her role of rebellious Rose Godolfus, the daughter of deli owner Aldo (Johnny Lockwood), in top-rated soap opera Number 96. She was a member of the original cast of Number 96 when it began in March 1972. Number 96 brought sexual situations and nude scenes to Australian television for the first time. Although series star Abigail became famous for being the first woman to appear topless on Australian television, in fact it was Garrett, who was topless in the serial's first episode, who deserves the credit. However the scene was screened only in Sydney. By the time the episode went to air in other localities in the days following, the shot had been cut by censors after complaints from viewers. Garrett remained in the show for five months, breaking her contract and leaving the series over a storyline where Rose was gang raped by a group of bikers in which the script called for her to be actually enjoying it. 

After leaving Number 96 she had a guest role in Division 4 and also worked in theatre. She spent three years as a company member of Rex Cramphorn's celebrated Performance Syndicate appearing in productions including The Tempest, Shakuntala and the Ring of Recognition, Muriel, Berenice, and Scapin. They also devised original physical theatre pieces and worked with internationally acclaimed Jerzy Grotowski and his company.

She resumed the role of Rose for a limited number of episodes of Number 96 in 1975, and appeared in a recurring sketch in comedy series The Norman Gunston Show called The Checkout Chicks. This sketch, written by Bill Harding, was a send-up of melodramatic soap operas and set in a supermarket. It featured other former Number 96 actors – Abigail, Candy Raymond, Philippa Baker, Judy Lynne, Anne Louise Lambert, John Paramor and Johnny Lockwood.

In 1976 she travelled to India where she studied yoga, meditation and philosophy at an ashram for 12 months under the guidance of Baba Muktananda in Ganeshpuri. She wrote about the experience in 1977 for the lifestyle magazine Simply Living. Back in Australia, she worked on student films for Australian Film Television and Radio School and continued to act in theatre and on screen.

Television
During her career, Garrett has appeared in a range of TV comedy and drama series for both adult and younger audiences including Cop Shop (1979), Mother and Son (1984), Bodyline (1984), Haydaze (1993), Ship to Shore, Sweat (1996), Minty (1998), The Shark Net (2003; TV movie), Streetsmartz and Lift (2019)

Film
Films include Caddie (1976)., Boundaries of the Heart (1988) Blackfellas (1993), Let's Get Skase (2001) and I Met a Girl (2020).

Theatre
Garrett has worked in theatre across Australia, appearing with many major companies, in productions including Blood Wedding, A Midsummer Night's Dream, Hamlet, The Crucible, Dear Janet Rosenberg, Dear Mr Kooning, Butterflies are Free, Measure for Measure, My Shadow and Me, Dusa, Fish, Stas and Vi, As You Like It, The Lady of the Camellias, On Our Selection, Waiting for Godot, The House of the Deaf Man, The Bride of Gospel Place, The Dybbuk, Variations, Top Girls., The Servant of Two Masters, Extremities, Europe, A Chorus of Disapproval, Rough Crossing, From Here to Maternity, The Popular Mechanics, Emma, Blood Moon, The Lift, Brilliant Lies, Breaststroke, Burning Time, Blackrock, The Vagina Monologues, Necessary Targets, Live Acts on Stage, Checklist for an Armed Robber, The Lonely Hearts Club, The Clean House, When the Rain Stops Falling, Biddies, Other Desert Cities, Lighten Up and Summer of the Seventeenth Doll.

She has starred in two one-woman shows: The Death of Minnie (1990) by Barry Dickens and Witchplay (1993) by Tobsha Learner, which Garrett produced.

Theatre Awards
In 1995 Garrett won the Swan Gold Award for Most Outstanding Female Actor for her portrayal of Eleanor in Dead Funny for the Perth Theatre Company. In 2014 she won Best Female Support Actor for her role of Silda in Other Desert Cities for Black Swan State Theatre Company/Queensland Theatre Company. She has also been nominated for roles in Live Acts on Stage, Equus, The Clean House and Summer of the Seventeenth Doll.

Directing
Garrett has worked as a theatre director on productions of Breaststroke, Ursula's Ecstasy, The Spook, Margritte and Tartuffe''. She has also directed more than twenty short story productions for ABC Radio National.

Further work
Since 2006 Garrett could be heard on Australian television as a voice-over artist. She has also taught Stage and Screen Acting, Voice and Theatre Studies at the Western Australian Academy of Performing Arts, University of Notre Dame Australia, TAFTA and NIDA.

Studies
After graduating from NIDA with a BA in Dramatic Arts Garrett went on to post graduate studies in Voice and Shakespearean Text at Simon Fraser University, Vancouver BC, Canada.

External links

Notes

Living people
Australian soap opera actresses
Australian stage actresses
Australian voice actresses
National Institute of Dramatic Art alumni
Place of birth missing (living people)
Western Australian Academy of Performing Arts alumni
Year of birth missing (living people)